Christina Athena Aktipis is an associate professor in the Department of Psychology at Arizona State University. She is the director of the Interdisciplinary Cooperation Initiative and the co-director of the Human Generosity Project. She is also the director of the Cooperation and Conflict lab at Arizona State University, vice president of the International Society for Evolution, Ecology and Cancer (ISEEC), and was the director of human and social evolution and co-founder of the Center for Evolution and Cancer at UCSF. She is a cooperation theorist, an evolutionary biologist, an evolutionary psychologist, and a cancer biologist who works at the intersection of those fields. Aktipis is the author of the book published on March 24, 2020, from Princeton University Press The Cheating Cell: How Evolution Helps us Understand and Treat Cancer. Athena hosts Zombified, a podcast created to communicate the science of zombification in daily life. Zombified is an extension of the Zombie Apocalypse Medicine Meeting (ZAMM), a biannual conference chaired by Aktipis. ZAMM is an interdisciplinary conference where art, science and medicine come together with the aim of solving complex issues.

Career

Aktipis earned a B.A. in psychology from Reed College in 2002. She earned an M.A. in 2004 and a Ph.D. in 2008 in psychology from the University of Pennsylvania. In 2011, she completed a postdoctoral fellowship in ecology and evolutionary biology with John Pepper at the University of Arizona. Between 2011 and 2014, Aktipis was an assistant research professor in the Department of Psychology at Arizona State University, while also serving as director of human and social evolution at the Center for Evolution and Cancer, at University of California San Francisco. During 2013–2014, Aktipis was a Fellow of the Institute for Advanced Study, Wissenschaftskolleg, Berlin. Upon her return to the United States, Aktipis and her colleague Lee Cronk, a professor in the Department of Anthropology at Rutgers University, co-founded The Human Generosity Project. Since 2015, Aktipis holds an appointment as an assistant professor in the Department of Psychology at Arizona State University.

Projects

Cooperation in the Apocalypse
The Cooperation in the Apocalypse team brings together interdisciplinary scientists to examine human behavior in times of crisis and panic such as the COVID-19 pandemic. The team started collecting data in March 2020, a few weeks before the United States went into lockdown, asking questions about mask-wearing behaviors, risk-taking behaviors, exercise routines, mental health, friendships, outdoor recreation, and more.

Interdisciplinary Cooperation Initiative
The ASU Interdisciplinary Cooperation Initiative brings together scholars from across the disciplines who are joined by a shared interest in understanding the fundamental principles that drive cooperation. It holds workshops and working group meetings with faculty in and outside of ASU, organizes a biannual Cooperation and Conflict Symposium, and the Interdisciplinary Study of Cooperation Winter School taught by world-renowned cooperation researchers. In addition to supporting the interdisciplinary study of cooperation, it also supports broader ventures to cultivate cooperation among the disciplines. Aktipis hosts a series of interactive livestreams joined by cooperation scientists.

The Human Generosity Project
A large focus of Aktipis' work is cooperation in humans, focusing especially on helping behavior that occurs in times of need. Aktipis co-directs the Human Generosity Project with Dr. Lee Cronk of Rutgers University. Together with the team, Drs. Aktipis and Cronk study the relationship between biological and cultural influences on human generosity by using multiple methodologies such as field work, laboratory experiments, and computational models.

Microbiome and human behavior
Microbes have access to many systems underlying human behavior. In her lab, Aktipis and colleagues explore how the microbiome may play a role in eating behavior and social behaviors.

Kombucha
Kombucha is a popular drink made by the fermentation of tea by symbiotic bacteria and yeast. Aktipis uses this beverage to explore microbial resource exchange and to determine whether the kombucha symbiosis is able to fight off pathogens that single species of microbes cannot.

Cancer and multicellular cooperation
Multicellular bodies are societies of cells that must cooperate and coordinate to contribute to organism fitness. Cancer represents a breakdown of multicellular cooperation. Aktipis examines cancer through this lens, using evolutionary theory, computational modeling, and clinical collaborations. Aktipi's most recent work on cancer is through the Arizona Cancer and Evolution Center, where she co-leads Project 1: Organismal Evolution and Cancer Defenses and the Outreach Unit.

Zombified Podcast
Aktipis created an educational podcast about how we are vulnerable to be controlled by things and what that means for our future. It features interviews with ASU Psychology Department faculty, other ASU faculty and scholars from outside of ASU talking about forces beyond our control that affect our behavior. It covers diverse disciplines including evolutionary biology, psychology, parasitology, microbiology, computer science and more.

Channel Zed
Aktipis created an educational TV channel in response to the challenges of hosting an in-person conference during the COVID-19 pandemic. Channel Zed is home to interactive livestream shows about how to survive and thrive in the apocalypse. As a think-tank where scholars, artists, practitioners, and thought leaders come together, Channel Zed is a container for all to grapple with humanity's most challenging threats while celebrating beautiful examples of resilience and strength. Channel Zed covers current events, lifestyle programming, emergency medicine and survival, history, culture, diy, and more.

Selected publications

Selected talks 
 "The Evolutionary Biology of Zombification", Center for Evolution and Medicine, Arizona State University, 2019
 "Why Cancer Is Everywhere", Harvard Museums of Science and Culture, 2018
 "Do You Believe in Generosity", TEDxASU, 2016
 "The Science of Sharing", The Exploratorium Museum, San Francisco, 2015
 "Why Do We Get Cancer?", Institute for Advanced Study, Wissenschaftskolleg, Berlin, 2014

Conferences 
Between 2011 and 2019, Aktipis organized five bi-annual conferences of the International Society for Evolution, Ecology and Cancer.

Aktipis is the founder of the Zombie Apocalypse Medicine Alliance and the conference chair of the Zombie Apocalypse Medicine Meeting, which debuted with its first meeting on October 18–21, 2018 scheduled to take place again October 20–23, 2022.

References

External links 
 
Profile on Google Scholar
https://cancer-insights.asu.edu/about-ace/ Arizona Cancer and Evolution Center
http://cancer.ucsf.edu/evolution Center for Evolution and Cancer at UCSF
http://www.humangenerosity.org/ The Human Generosity Project
http://www.aktipislab.org/ Cooperation and Conflict Lab
http://www.zombiemed.org/ Zombie Apocalypse Medicine Meeting
https://www.zombified.org/ Zombified Podcast
https://cooperation.asu.edu/ Interdisciplinary Cooperation Initiative
https://channelzed.org/ Channel Zed

Living people
Year of birth missing (living people)
Arizona State University faculty
Cancer researchers
Reed College alumni
University of Arizona alumni
University of Pennsylvania School of Arts and Sciences alumni
Women evolutionary biologists